Nationality words link to articles with information on the nation's poetry or literature (for instance, Irish or France).

Events
 Allen Ginsberg crowned "Majelis King" in Prague on May Day.
 Jason Shinder, an American poet, expands a New York City Y.M.C.A. writing education program nationwide, thereby founding the Y.M.C.A. National Writer's Voice program, one of the country's largest networks of literary-arts centers, with 24 locations by 2008. Writers who teach in the program include poets Adrienne Rich and Galway Kinnell, novelists Michael Cunningham and E. L. Doctorow, and playwright Wendy Wasserstein.

Works published in English
Listed by nation where the work was first published and again by the poet's native land, if different; substantially revised works listed separately:

Australia
 Jennifer Maiden:
 Bastille Day, NLA
 Selected Poems of Jennifer Maiden, Penguin
 The Winter Baby, Angus & Robertson
 Les Murray, Dog Fox Field Sydney: Angus & Robertson, 1990; Carcanet, 1991 and New York, Farrar, Straus and Giroux, 1993
 Chris Wallace-Crabbe:
 For Crying Out Loud, Oxford: Oxford University Press
 Poetry and Belief (scholarship), Hobart: University of  Tasmania

Canada
 Dionne Brand, No Language is Neutral
 George Elliott Clarke, Whylah Falls, Vancouver: Polestar,  (revised edition, 2000 )
 A. E. Davidson, Studies on Canadian Literature (scholarship), Canada
 Louis Dudek, Continuation II. Montreal: Véhicule Press.
 George Johnston, Endeared by Dark: The Collected Poems
 A.M. Klein, Complete Poems.Toronto: University of Toronto Press.
 A.M. Klein, Doctor Dwarf and Other Poems for Children. Kingston, ON: Quarry Press.
Archibald Lampman, Selected Poetry of Archibald Lampman, Michael Gnarowski ed. (Ottawa: Tecumseh). 
 James Reaney, Performance Poems.
 Michael Redhill, Impromptu Feats of Balance, Don Mills, Ontario: Wolsak & Wynn
 Ajmer Rode, Poems at my Doorstep, by a Punjabi poet living and published in Canada and writing in English; Vancouver: Caitlin Press, 
 Ricardo Sternberg, Invention of Honey, Montreal: Signal Editions
 Phyllis Webb, Hanging Fire

India, in English
 Dom Moraes, Serendip ( Poetry in English ) .
 Eunice de Souza, Ways of Belonging: Selected Poems ( Poetry in English ), Edinburgh: Polygon, United Kingdom

Ireland
 Eavan Boland, Outside History, including "The Latin Lesson" and "Midnight Flowers", Carcanet Press
 Pat Boran:
History and Promise (IUP)
The Unwound Clock (Dedalus)
 Ciarán Carson, Belfast Confetti, Bloodaxe, Wake Forest University Press, Irish poet published in the United Kingdom
 Paul Durcan, Daddy, Daddy
 Padraic Fallon, Collected Poems, introduction by Seamus Heaney, Oldcastle: The Gallery Press,  published posthumously
 Seamus Heaney:
 The Tree Clock, Linen Hall Library
 New Selected Poems 1966-1987, Faber & Faber
 The Redress of Poetry, criticism
 Michael D. Higgins, The Betrayal
 Paul Muldoon, Madoc, including "Cauliflowers", Faber and Faber, Irish poet published in the United Kingdom
 Eilean Ni Chuilleanain, The Magdalene Sermon, including "The Informant", Oldcastle: The Gallery Press

New Zealand
 Allen Curnow, Selected Poems 1940–1989
 Bill Manhire, The Old Man's Example
 Frank McKay, Life of James K. Baxter, Auckland: Oxford University Press; called the "standard biography" of New Zealand's "probably New Zealand's best-known poet"
 Cilla McQueen, Berlin Diary, winner of the 1991 New Zealand Book Award for Poetry

United Kingdom
 Dannie Abse, Remembrance of Crimes Past
 Eavan Boland, Outside History
 Ciarán Carson: Belfast Confetti, Bloodaxe, Wake Forest University Press, Irish poet published in the United Kingdom
 Cary Archard, editor, Poetry Wales: 25 Years, Seren, an anthology
 Donald Davie, Collected Poems
 Paul Durcan, Daddy, Daddy
 Carol Ann Duffy, The Other Country, Anvil Press Poetry (poetry)
 Padraic Fallon, Collected Poems, introduction by Seamus Heaney, published posthumously
 Elaine Feinstein, City Music, Hutchinson
 Tony Harrison
 Losing Touch
 The Trackers of Oxyrhynchus
 Seamus Heaney:
 The Tree Clock, Linen Hall Library
 New Selected Poems 1966-1987, Faber & Faber
 The Redress of Poetry, criticism
 John Heath-Stubbs:
 The Game of Love and Death
 Selected Poems
 John Hegley, Glad to Wear Glasses (glad to have ears)
 Adrian Henri, Box, and Other Poems
 Alan Jenkins, Greenheart
 Derek Mahon, The Chinese Restaurant in Portrush: Selected Poems. Gallery Press
 Glyn Maxwell, Tale of the Mayor's Son
 Edwin Morgan, Collected Poems
 Brian Patten, Collected Poems
 Ruth Pitter, Collected Poems, introduction by Elizabeth Jennings
 Peter Redgrove, Dressed as for a Tarot Pack
 Peter Scupham, Watching the Perseids
 R.S. Thomas, Counterpoint
 Hugo Williams, Self-Portrait with a Slide

United States
 Elizabeth Alexander, The Venus Hottentot
 Maya Angelou, I Shall Not be Moved
 Frank Bidart, In the Western Night: Collected Poems 1965–90 (Farrar, Straus and Giroux)
 Philip Booth, Selves, Viking Penguin
 George F. Butterick and Richard Blevins, editors, Charles Olson and Robert Creeley: The Complete Correspondence, ninth and last volume published this year (first volume published in 1980), Santa Barbara, California, biography and criticism
 Maxine Chernoff, Leap Year Day: New & Selected Poems (Another Chicago Press)
 Alice Fulton, Powers of Congress
 David Graham, Second Wind, Texas Tech University Press
 David Lehman, Operation Memory, Princeton University Press
 Thomas Lux, The Drowned River, Houghton Mifflin
 Jean Marzollo, Pretend You're a Cat
 Mary Oliver, House of Light
 Peter Oresick, Definitions (West End Press) and Working Classics (University of Illinois Press)
 Mark Strand, The Continuous Life, Canadian native living in and published in the United States
 Derek Walcott, Omeros
 Rosmarie Waldrop, Peculiar Motions (Kelsey St. Press)
 Reed Whittemore, The Past, the Future, the Present: Poems Selected and New

Anthologies in the United States
 Michael James Hutt, editor and translator, Himalayan Voices: An Introduction to Modern Nepali Literature, University of California Press
 Peter H. Lee, editor, Modern Korean Literature, including poetry, University of Hawai'i Press
 Edward Morin, editor, The Red Azalea: Chinese Poetry since the Cultural Revolution, University of Hawai'i Press

Poets included in The Best American Poetry 1990
These 75 poets were included in The Best American Poetry 1990, edited by David Lehman with Jorie Graham, guest editor:

A. R. Ammons
John Ash
John Ashbery
Marvin Bell
Stephen Berg
Mei-mei Berssenbrugge
Hayden Carruth
Anne Carson
Raymond Carver
Amy Clampitt
Killarney Clary
Robert Creeley
Christopher Davis
Thomas M. Disch
Norman Dubie

Aaron Fogel
James Galvin
Suzanne Gardinier
Amy Gerstler
Linda Gregg
Thom Gunn
Donald Hall
Daniel Halpern
Robert Hass
Seamus Heaney
Anthony Hecht
Emily Hiestand
Brenda Hillman
John Hollander
Virginia Hooper

Richard Howard
Fanny Howe
Rodney Jones
Galway Kinnell
Edward Kleinschmidt
Yusef Komunyakaa
Denise Levertov
Philip Levine
Thomas Lux
Nathaniel Mackey
Kevin Magee
Thomas McGrath
Lynne McMahon
Jane Mead
James Merrill

W. S. Merwin
Jane Miller
Susan Mitchell
Paul Monette
Laura Moriarty
Thylias Moss
Melinda Mueller
Laura Mullen
Alice Notley
Michael Palmer
Robert Pinsky
Jendi Reiter
Joan Retallack
Donald Revell
Adrienne Rich

Michael Ryan
James Schuyler
Frederick Seidel
Charles Simic
Gustaf Sobin
Elizabeth Spires
David St. John
Gerald Stern
Mark Strand
James Tate
Sidney Wade
Rosanna Warren
Richard Wilbur
Eleanor Wilner
Charles Wright

Other in English
 Ramabai Espinet, Creation Fire: A CAFRA Anthology of Caribbean Women's Poetry
 Derek Walcott, Omeros, St. Lucia poet living in the United States

Works published in other languages
Listed by nation where the work was first published and again by the poet's native land, if different; substantially revised works listed separately:

French language

Canada, in French
 Denise Desautels, Leçons de Venise ("Venice Lessons"), about three sculptures by Michel Goulet, Saint-Lambert: Le Noroît
 Suzanne Jacob, Filandere Cantabile, Paris: Marval

France
 Abdellatif Laabi, Moroccan author writing in and published in France:
 Tous les déchirements. Messidor, Paris (épuisé)
 translator, La Poésie palestinienne contemporaine, an anthology translated from the original Arabic; Paris: Éditions Messidor
 translator, L'Espace du Noûn, translated in collaboration with Leïla Khatib from the original Arabic of Hassan Hamdane;  Paris: Éditions Messidor

Hungary
 Attila Balogh, Versek ("Poems")
 György Petri, Valami ismeretlen
 Gábor Tompa, Készenlét ("Alertness"), Budapest

India
Listed in alphabetical order by first name:
 Joy Goswami, Kabita-Songroho, Vol. 1, Kolkata: Ananda Publishers,  (six reprints by 2001); Bangladeshi-language
 K. Satchidanandan, Kayattam, ("The Ascent"); Malayalam-language
 Vaidehi, pen name of Janaki Srinivasa Murthy, Bindu Bindige, Sagara: Akshara Prakashana; Kannada-language
 Varavara Rao (better known as "VV"), Muktakantam or Muktakantham ("Free Throat"), Vijayawada: Samudram Prachuranalu; Telugu-language
 Yash Sharma, Jo Tere Man Chitt Laggi Ja ("Whatever Touches Your Heart and Souls"), winner of the Sahitya Academy Award; Dogri-language

Poland
 Stanisław Barańczak:
 159 wiersze 1968-88 ("159 Poems"), Kraków: Znak
 Tablica z Macondo. Osiemnascie prob wytlumaczenia, po co i dlaczego sie pisze ("A License Plate from Macondo: Eighteen Attempts at Explaining Why One Writes"), criticism; London: Aneks
 Zbigniew Herbert, Elegia na odejście ("Elegy for the Departure"), Paris: Instytut Literacki
 Ewa Lipska, ("Limited Standing Zone"); Warsaw: Czytelnik
 Eugeniusz Tkaczyszyn-Dycki, Nenia i inne wiersze
 Jan Twardowski, Tak ludzka, Poznań: Księgarnia św. Wojciech
 Adam Zagajewski:
 Płótno, Paris: Zeszyty Literackie
 Płótno, Paris: Zeszyty Literackie

Spanish language

Spain
 Matilde Camus, El color de mi cristal ("The colour of my glasses")

Other languages
 Christoph Buchwald, general editor, and Karl Mickel, guest editor, Jahrbuch der Lyrik 1990/91 ("Poetry Yearbook 1990/91"), publisher: Luchterhand; anthology; Germany
 Mircea Cărtărescu, The Levant (Levantul), Romania
 Luo Fu, Chinese (Taiwan):
Nirvana of Angels
House of Midnight
 Nuala Ní Dhomhnaill, Pharaoh's Daughter, including "Fear Suaithinseach", "An Bhabog Bhriste", "An Bhean Mhidhilis", and "Ceist na Teangan", Oldcastle: The Gallery Press, Gaelic-language, Ireland
 Maria Luisa Spaziani, Giovanna d'Arco, Italy

Awards and honors

Australia
 C. J. Dennis Prize for Poetry: Robert Adamson, The Clean Dark
 Kenneth Slessor Prize for Poetry: Robert Adamson, The Clean Dark
 Mary Gilmore Prize: Kristopher Rassemussen – In the Name of the Father

Canada
 Gerald Lampert Award: Steven Heighton, Stalin's Carnival
 Archibald Lampman Award: Gary Geddes, No Easy Exit
 1990 Governor General's Awards: Margaret Avison, No Time (English); Jean-Paul Daoust, Les Cendres bleues (French)
 Pat Lowther Award: Patricia Young, The Mad and Beautiful Mothers
 Prix Alain-Grandbois: Juan Garcia, Corps du gloire
 Dorothy Livesay Poetry Prize: Victoria Walker, Suitcase
 Prix Émile-Nelligan: Claude Paré, Chemins de sel

India
 Poetry Society India National Poetry Competition : Rukmini Bhaya Nair for Kali (poem)Kali

United Kingdom
 Cholmondeley Award : Kingsley Amis, Elaine Feinstein, Michael O'Neill
 Eric Gregory Award : Nicholas Drake, Maggie Hannan, William Park, Jonathan Davidson, Lavinia Greenlaw, Don Paterson, John Wells
 Queen's Gold Medal for Poetry : Sorley Maclean
 National Poetry Competition : Nick Rice for Room Service

United States
 Agnes Lynch Starrett Poetry Prize: Debra Allbery, Walking Distance
 Aiken Taylor Award for Modern American Poetry: W. S. Merwin
 AML Award for poetry to Loretta Randall Sharp for "Doing It"
 Bernard F. Connors Prize for Poetry: Christopher Logue, "Kings"
 Bobbitt National Prize for Poetry: James Merrill, The Inner Room
 Frost Medal: Denise Levertov / James Laughlin
 National Book Award for Poetry: No prize given
 Poet Laureate Consultant in Poetry to the Library of Congress: Mark Strand
 Pulitzer Prize for Poetry: Charles Simic: The World Doesn't End
 Ruth Lilly Poetry Prize: Hayden Carruth
 Whiting Awards: Emily Hiestand, Dennis Nurkse
 Fellowship of the Academy of American Poets: William Meredith

Births
 March 29 – Kiran Millwood Hargrave, English poet, playwright and novelist

Deaths
Birth years link to the corresponding "[year] in poetry" article:
 March 13 – Teiko Tomita (born 1894), Japanese-born American poet who wrote in Japanese
 May 14 – Mary Oppen, 82 (born 1908), American poet, activist, artist, photographer and writer, wife of George Oppen
 October 12 – Nagai Tatsuo 永井龍男, used the pen-name of "Tomonkyo" for his poetry (born 1904), Japanese, Shōwa-period novelist, short-story writer, haiku poet, editor and journalist
 November 7 – Lawrence Durrell, 78 (born 1912), English novelist, poet, dramatist and travel writer
 November 11 – Yiannis Ritsos (born 1909), Greek
 Also:
 Frances Chung (born 1950), Chinese American
 Nikos Karouzos (born 1926), Greek
 John Ormond (born 1923), Welsh poet and journalist

See also

Poetry
List of years in poetry
List of poetry awards

References

20th-century poetry
Poetry